Chaumeil is a commune in the Corrèze department in central France in the Nouvelle-Aquitaine region.

Geography

Location
Chaumeil is located 22 km northeast of Tulle, 15 km north-west of Egletons and 10 km southeast of Treignac, in the heart of the Massif des Monédières.

The municipality is part of the territory of the Parc naturel régional de Millevaches en Limousin (Regional Natural Park of the Millevaches) in the Limousin. It is watered by the Corrèze, the Corrèze de Pradines, the Douyge and a stream from the pond (mother branch of the Vimbelle).

Population

Places and monuments
 The Croix de Chaumeil, a 16th-century stone cross in the village of Chaumeil.
 Church, a 15th-century church with a covered 16th century porch, inside a wood polychrome naive pieta, Madonna and child and reliquary.
 Maison des Monédières, gourmet food and handicrafts.

Notable people
 Jean-Baptiste Billot (1828-1907), born in the village of Chastagnol, general of the French Army, was a member of the National Assembly (1871-1875), an unmovable senator and three times Minister of War (1882-1883 and 1896-1898).
 Jean Ségurel, accordionist.

See also
Communes of the Corrèze department

References

Communes of Corrèze